Sangabad may refer to:
 Sangabad, Ardabil
 Sangabad, Arzuiyeh, Kerman Province
 Sangabad, Rigan, Kerman Province
 Sangabad, South Khorasan